Stanley Ka Dabba is a 2011 Hindi-language comedy drama film written, directed and produced by Amole Gupte, starring Divya Dutta, Partho Gupte (son of Amole Gupte), Divya Jagdale, Raj Zutshi, and Amole Gupte. The film was released on 13 May 2011.

Plot

Stanley (Partho Gupte) is a fourth grader at Holy Family school in Mumbai and is very popular among his friends. He is talented and well liked by his peers. The English teacher, Ms. Rosy, (Divya Dutta) is particularly impressed with his creativity, wit, and humour.  Stanley is shown with a bruised face in the opening scene of the movie. On being questioned about it by Ms. Rosy, he concocts an elaborate story, much to her amusement. His humorous essays and offhand poem recitations make him her favourite in class. However his imagination is not always rewarded; his science teacher (Divya Jagdale) rebukes his attempt at constructing a light house as part of the class project since it does not adhere to the topics covered in class.

It is shown early on that he doesn't bring his lunch box or 'dabba' to school, unlike all his other classmates. Verma (Amole Gupte) is a ravenous Hindi teacher; a phagomaniac who does not bring his own dabba either but lusts after everyone else's, also stealing food on occasion. The kids at school nickname him as 'Khadoos' (cantankerous person). He has a poor reputation among his peers for his mindless and inconsiderate gluttony. He particularly eyes the dabba of one of Stanley's friends and shamelessly joins the group in class as soon as the lunch bell goes off to gorge on their food. A lot of his class time is spent discussing what his students brought for lunch.

One day, he ends up coming late during lunch-break and misses out on eating what he had earlier hoped to eat from the children's dabbas. Upon realising that the food in question was shared with Stanley, Khadoos berates him for not getting his own dabba. Stanley senses Khadoos' hostility towards him and avoids eating from his friends' dabbas thereafter, telling them every day during lunch break that he is going home to enjoy a hot meal prepared by his mother. His friends catch his bluff soon after when they find him loitering around the school during lunch break. When confronted, Stanley tells them that there is no one to cook for him until his parents get back from Delhi. Eager to help their hungry friend out, Stanley's friends start hiding from Khadoos during lunch break while sharing their dabbas with Stanley. Chagrined, Khadoos starts hunting for them arduously during lunch break every day. He catches hold of them eventually on the terrace, empty dabbas in tow. Upon realising that the group shared their lunches with Stanley again, he menacingly threatens Stanley to either bring his own dabba or stop coming to school. Stanley obliges and stops coming to school.

In this time, Stanley's friends come to know of an inter-school concert that they think he would be a perfect fit for. However, since he is debarred from school by Khadoos, Stanley remains sceptical about his chances. He secretly starts attending practice sessions for the concert and begins learning the dance steps and song lyrics by himself. Soon after, he is spotted practising by one of the organizers of the concert. His talent is recognised and he is immediately included in the troupe. In the meantime, Stanley's absence is felt by his teachers and friends, who finally spill the beans to Ms. Rosy about the reason behind his nonattendance. Aghast and disgusted, Ms. Rosy confronts Khadoos in front of other staff members asking him to "have some shame" since Stanley "is just a child". Khadoos begins realising his folly.

One fine day, Stanley brings his own dabba to school. He offers it to Khadoos on a platter and asks him for permission to come back to school. Guilt-ridden and shame-faced, Khadoos resigns from his post. He apologises to Stanley in a handwritten letter and promises to never return.

Meanwhile, the inter-school concert is attended by the entire staff of Holy Family, all of whom appreciate Stanley's performance. Ms. Rosy congratulates Stanley after the concert and offers him a ride home. However, he refuses saying that his mother is waiting for him in her car. The school's Principal (Rahul Singh) later drops Stanley home, which we realise isn't "home" but the restaurant at which he works. An orphan, Stanley is frequently physically abused by the proprietor of the restaurant (his own uncle – Shashank Shende), leaving him badly bruised. He hits Stanley in the face for remaining absent from work for the majority of the day. A cook at the restaurant, Akram, empathises with Stanley and promises to pack leftovers at the restaurant into his 'dabba' every day, without his uncle's knowledge. Stanley and Akram stay back and clean the place up for the night. The scene ends with Stanley lighting a candle next to a photograph of his parents, before going to bed. The next day onward, Stanley brings his own dabba to school and shares it with everyone while regaling them with details about how his mother prepared everything.

Cast
 Partho Gupte as Stanley Fernandes
 Divya Dutta as Rosy Miss (English Teacher)
 Divya Jagdale as Mrs. Iyer (Science Teacher)
 Raj Zutshi as Rajendranath Zutshi (History Teacher)
 Aditya Lakhia as Parshu (Peon)
 Rahul Singh as the Principal
 Shiv Kumar Subramaniam as a Math Teacher
 Kadambari Shantshree as an Art Teacher
 Amole Gupte as Babubhai Verma a.k.a. Khadoos (Hindi Teacher)
 Shashank Shende as Restaurant Owner (Stanley's uncle)
 Vidyut Jammwal as Rosy Miss's fiancée
 Numaan Shaikh as Aman Mehra (Stanley's friend)
 Jitendra Rai as Akram
 Kunchacko Boban as Byrendranath Boban/Kunchacko 
 Upendra as Shivaganga/Uppi
 Mahesh Babu as Srinivas Raju Konidela
 Vishal as Udaya Kumar

Production
After the success of Taare Zameen Par Amole Gupte wanted to make a small, non-mainstream film. He borrowed money from friends and began shooting with a five-man crew in a Mumbai school. The crew shot during four-hour workshops every Saturday for a year and a half to capture all the scenes they needed. Shot using a Canon EOS 7D, the film used 170 child actors in total. After the film was completed, Gupte showed it to Karan Johar and he helped him to sign a distribution deal with Fox Star Studios.

Critical reception

Stanley Ka Dabba attracted positive reviews from critics across India. Raja Sen of rediff.com gave it a rating of 5 stars out of 5 stating that it was the "Best, purest film to come out of Hindi cinema in a while". Film critic Rajeev Masand of CNN-IBN gave it a rating of 4/5 calling it "heartwarming". Anupama Chopra of NDTV said – "I recommend that you make time for the film. It has an inherent sweetness and honesty that will stay with you long after the film is over" and gave it 3.5 out of 5 stars. Pratim D. Gupta of The Telegraph gave two thumbs up to Stanley Ka Dabba calling it "a trip back to the innocence and goodness of childhood". Gupta wrote "because if there's one thing this movie reminds you, it is: Life is like Stanley ka dabba... you never know what you’re gonna get". Entertainment portal FilmiTadka gave it 3.5 out of five stars and in a statement wrote – "Stanley Ka Dabba is definitely not as opulent as Taare Zameen Par, but the director manages to keep the film on the right track, as an audience I found myself laughing, crying and feeling for the kids. It's a simple story which definitely reminds one about his/her school days". Nikhat Kazmi of Times of India wrote "Don't miss this rich and nuanced soul curry for both, the young and adult heart", giving SKD once again 3.5 out of 5 stars. It has an aggregate rating of 8 out of 10 on ReviewGang.

Soundtrack
The music of the film is composed by Hitesh Sonik and Amole Gupte. Lyrics are penned by Amole Gupte.

Track listing

Box office 

Accolades

References

External links
 
 

2011 films
2010s Hindi-language films
Films shot in India
Indian children's films
Fox Star Studios films
2010s children's films